The 2010 Mid-American Conference football season was the 65th season for the Mid-American Conference (MAC). The season began on Thursday, September 2, with five games: Ball State hosted Southeast Missouri State, Central Michigan hosted Hampton, Kent State hosted Murray State, Buffalo hosted Rhode Island, and Northern Illinois traveled to Ames, Iowa to face Iowa State. The conference's other eight teams began their respective 2010 seasons of NCAA Division I FBS (Football Bowl Subdivision) competition on Friday, September 3, and Saturday, September 4. The first in-conference game was September 9, with Temple hosting Central Michigan.

The 2010 MAC Championship Game featured the Northern Illinois Huskies and the Miami RedHawks, held December 3, at Ford Field in Detroit. Miami defeated Northern Illinois 26-21 on a 33-yard pass from Austin Boucher to Armand Robinson for a touchdown with 33 seconds remaining in regulation.

Four MAC teams were invited to post-season bowl games, with conference champion Miami, West Division champion Northern Illinois, West Division runner-up Toledo, and East Division runner-up Ohio getting bids. The only bowl-eligible schools not to receive invitations were Western Michigan (6-6) and Temple (8-4), the latter being the first team with a winning record to be passed over for a team with a .500 record under an NCAA rule change.

Previous season

West Division champion Central Michigan entered the 2009 MAC Championship Game undefeated in MAC play, their only losses coming at Arizona and at Boston College. The Ohio Bobcats were selected to represent the East Division by virtue of a tie-breaking head-to-head victory against the Temple Owls in the final regular-season game; both teams were 9-3 overall and 7-1 in conference games. In a rematch of the 2006 game, Central Michigan again won, for their third MAC championship in four years. Following the game, Central Michigan coach Butch Jones left to become the head coach at the University of Cincinnati. Steve Stripling, the defensive ends coach, became interim head coach and coached the GMAC bowl.

Five MAC teams  Ohio, Temple, Bowling Green, Northern Illinois, and Central Michigan  played in post-season bowl games, though only Central Michigan won, defeating Sun Belt Conference champion Troy 44-41 in two overtimes in the 2010 GMAC Bowl. In mid-January, Dan Enos, previously a running backs coach for the Michigan State Spartans, was named the new head coach at Central Michigan. There were no other coaching changes in the conference.

Conference realignment

The Mid-American Conference was entirely left out of the 2010 NCAA conference realignment, with no school entering or leaving the conference. There was some speculation that football-only member Temple was under consideration to become a football-only member of the Big East Conference.

After being rebuffed by the Big East in November, the University of Massachusetts Amherst Minutemen are expected to become a football-only member starting in the fall of 2013, following a two-year transition from the Football Championship Subdivision to the Football Bowl Subdivision. The arrangement is expected to be similar to Temple's, with UMass required to schedule certain numbers of non-conference games in other sports against MAC schools.

Preseason

Preseason poll
The 2010 MAC Preseason poll results were announced at the Football Media Preview in Detroit on July 30. In the West Division, Northern Illinois was picked as champion, while Temple was picked to win the East Division and the MAC Championship Game.

East Division
 Temple – 137 points; 17 first-place votes
 Ohio – 116 points; 3 first-place votes
 Kent State – 94 points
 Bowling Green – 74 points
 Miami – 53 points
 Buffalo – 48 points
 Akron – 38 points

West Division
 Northern Illinois – 115 points; 15 first-place votes
 Central Michigan – 83 points; 3 first-place votes
 Western Michigan – 77 points; 2 first-place votes
 Toledo – 75 points
 Ball State – 50 points
 Eastern Michigan – 20 points

MAC Championship
Three votes were not cast for any team.

 Temple – 11 votes
 Northern Illinois – 5 votes
 Ohio – 1 votes

Head coaches

East Division
 Rob Ianello, Akron (1st Year)
 Dave Clawson, Bowling Green (2nd Year)
 Jeff Quinn, Buffalo (1st Year)
 Doug Martin, Kent State (6th Year)
 Michael Haywood, Miami (2nd Year)
 Frank Solich, Ohio (6th Year)
 Al Golden, Temple (5th Year)

West Division
 Stan Parrish, Ball State (2nd Year)
 Dan Enos, Central Michigan (1st Year)
 Ron English, Eastern Michigan (2nd Year)
 Jerry Kill, Northern Illinois (3rd Year)
 Tim Beckman, Toledo (2nd Year)
 Bill Cubit Western Michigan (6th Year)

Post-season coaching changes

On November 21, the day after Kent State's seventh loss of the season assured them of a losing record, Doug Martin announced that he would resign at the end of the season. On December 20, Kent State athletic director Joel Nielsen introduced former Ohio State receivers coach Darrell Hazell as the new head coach for the Golden Flashes. Hazell was the first Ohio State assistant coach to leave for a head coaching job in six years; the last was Mark Snyder, who was hired by Marshall in 2004.

On November 23, three days after Ball State concluded its season with a 4-8 record, Ball State athletic director Tom Collins announced the firing of Stan Parrish, saying, "As we evaluated the on-field performance and the football program in its entirety, we decided it was time for a change in direction in the leadership of the program". On December 19, Collins announced that he had hired Pete Lembo, formerly the head coach at Elon.

On December 5, Northern Illinois head coach Jerry Kill accepted the position of head coach for the Minnesota Golden Gophers.  His announcement came less than two weeks before the Huskies were scheduled to play in the Humanitarian Bowl.  Leaving the team in the manner he did (many teammates learned about his new job via Twitter instead of from Kill himself) dealt an emotional blow to the members of the team; star quarterback Chandler Harnish saying about Kill's departure, "I have a horrible taste in my mouth".  Additionally, besides the emotional impact, USA Today noted "The timing of the announcement further hurts the program due to Kill most likely taking the bulk of his staff to Minnesota."  On December 9, linebackers coach Tom Matukewicz was announced as the interim head coach for the Huskies bowl game, and on December 13, the university hired Wisconsin Badgers defensive coordinator Dave Doeren as the head coach, to begin after the Humanitarian Bowl.

On December 12, ESPN reported that Al Golden was offered and accepted the head coaching job at the University of Miami. Prior to the 2010 season, provisions requiring bowls to pick teams with seven or more wins if available before picking six-win teams were eliminated from NCAA bylaws, and Temple was the first team go uninvited under the rule change, despite going 8–4 including a win over eventual Big East BCS representative Connecticut. On December 22, a rumor was quickly confirmed that Florida offensive coordinator, and former Florida interim head coach (winter of 2009–2010), Steve Addazio would be the new Temple coach.

On December 16, ESPN reported that Michael Haywood, who had been named the 2010 Mid-American Conference Football Coach of the Year days before, had accepted the head football coaching position at the University of Pittsburgh. Haywood was arrested in South Bend, Indiana, on December 31, 2010, on felony domestic violence charges arising from a custody dispute, and was fired by Pittsburgh hours after being released on bond the next morning. Defensive backs coach Lance Guidry will coach Miami University in the 2011 GoDaddy.com Bowl. On December 31, 2010, Miami University hired Michigan State offensive coordinator Don Treadwell as its head coach.

Schedules

In any given year, each team plays all the other teams in the same division, and about half the teams in the opposite division.

Homecoming games
October 2
Ohio at Eastern Michigan 12:00 pm
Idaho at Western Michigan 2:00 pm
Northern Illinois at Akron 6:00 pm

October 9
Western Michigan at Ball State 12:00 pm
Akron at Kent State 3:30 pm

October 16
Miami University at Central Michigan 12:00 pm
Buffalo at Northern Illinois 2:30 pm
Akron at Ohio 2:00 pm

October 23
Ohio at Miami University 1:00 pm

Bye weeks

 Week four: Kent State, Western Michigan
 Week six: Buffalo
 Week ten: Eastern Michigan, Northern Illinois, Toledo, Bowling Green, Miami
 Week eleven: Ohio, Akron, Temple
 Week twelve: Central Michigan
 Week thirteen: Ball State

Season

Week one

Temple running back Bernard Pierce had been considered a possible Heisman candidate before the season, but he was dropped from watchlists following an underwhelming week 1 performance. Pierce carried 20 times for 75 yards and no touchdowns in Temple's win over Villanova.

Week two

Week three

Week four

Bye week: Kent State, Western Michigan

In week four, two MAC teams (Kent State, Western Michigan) took the week off, while the other eleven teams took to the road. Eight MAC teams visited Big Ten schools, bringing the total MAC versus Big Ten matches to thirteen for the year.

Week five

Week six

For week 6, Buffalo had the week off.

Week seven

Week eight

Week nine

Week ten

For week 10, Eastern Michigan, Northern Illinois, Toledo, Bowling Green, and Miami had the week off.

Week eleven

For week eleven, Ohio, Akron, and Temple had the week off.

Week twelve

For week twelve, Central Michigan had the week off.

With their win over Ball State, Northern Illinois clinched the West Division championship and a berth to the MAC Championship Game; the Huskies were one game ahead of the next team (Toledo) with one game remaining, and would win a tie-breaker based on their earlier defeat of the Rockets.

Week thirteen

Ball State did not play in week 13; the Cardinals' final game was on November 20.

With their win over Temple, Miami secured a 7-1 conference record, but because the RedHawks lost to Ohio earlier in the season, they did not win the East Division until the Bobcats lost to Kent State three days later.

MAC Championship

Bowl games

Records against other conferences

The following summarizes MAC performance against other conferences.

MAC vs. AQ matchups
During the season, MAC teams played several games against AQ conference opponents.  Some of these games are regularly contested rivalry games.

Players of the week

Throughout the regular season, the Mid-American Conference offices name offensive, defensive and special teams players of the week for each division. Several players won multiple awards: Matt Rinehart from Kent State was the East Division Special Teams Player of the Week three times ( week 6,9 and 10). Chandler Harnish from Northern Illinois was the West Division Offensive Player of the Week three times(week 5,6 and 11) Paul Hershey from Ohio was the East Division Special Teams Player of the Week twice (week 3 and week 4), Muhammad Wilkerson from Temple was the East Division Defensive Player of the Week twice (week 2 and week 8), Freddy Cortez from Kent State was the East Division Special Teams Player of the Week twice (week 2 and week 8), Nick Harwell from Ball State was the East Division Offensive player of the week twice ( week 9 and week 11), Dwayne Woods from Bowling Green was named East Division Defensive player of the week twice (week 3 and week 11), Trevor Cook from Miami was named East Division Special Teams player of the week twice (week 5 and week 11), Ian McGarvey from Ball State was named West Division Special Teams player of the week twice (week 10 and week 11)and Dwayne Priest of Eastern Michigan was named West Division Offensive player of the week twice (week 1 and week 12). Through week 12, only Akron has failed to produce a Player of the Week.

Statistics

Team

Individual

Attendance

2011 NFL Draft

Prospects from the MAC who were all invited to the NFL Combine:
LB Nick Bellore, Central Michigan
FS Jaiquawn Jarrett, Temple
LB Elijah "Peanut" Joseph, Temple
CB Josh Thomas, Buffalo
DT Muhammad Wilkerson, Temple

On April 28, DT Muhammad Wilkerson, a junior from Temple, was selected by the New York Jets near the end of the first round of the draft, with the 30th overall pick.

References